Scrobipalpa semnani is a moth in the family Gelechiidae. It was described by Povolný in 1967. It is found in Iran.

References

Scrobipalpa
Moths described in 1967